Reynolds High School is the only public high school in Troutdale, Oregon, United States, in the northeastern part of the Portland metropolitan area. It is part of the Reynolds School District, and is the second-largest high school in Oregon.

History
The school takes its name from the school district, which was named for the Reynolds Aluminum plant in the city that closed in 2000.

On May 29, 1979, a three-alarm fire injured three students and damaged the gym and theater.

Reynolds High School merged with Columbia High School in 1989. Columbia High School is now the site of Reynolds High School, and the former Reynolds High School is now one of three middle schools in the district, Reynolds Middle School.

2014 shooting
On June 10, 2014, an active shooter situation occurred at the school during morning period. One student, 14-year-old freshman Emilio Hoffman, was killed. A physical education teacher suffered non-life-threatening injuries. The shooter, 15-year-old Jared Michael Padgett, who was using an AR-15 and also equipped with a handgun and a knife, engaged a responding officer in a gunfight before retreating inside a school bathroom, where he fatally shot himself. SWAT and FBI agents secured the school. The students were evacuated and were released to their parents at a nearby Fred Meyer store. The shooting occurred on the second-to-last day of the school year.

During the evacuation, a second gun, which was unrelated to the shooting, was found at the scene and one person, who did not have a permit to carry a concealed firearm, was taken into custody. The individual confessed to bringing the gun to the school to protect his sister, a freshman at the school.

Padgett had planned to pursue a career in the United States Armed Forces. He was a member of the Junior Reserve Officers' Training Corps program, and his oldest brother served in the military in Afghanistan. Padgett had managed to acquire his weapons from a secured area in the family home.

This was the first fatal school shooting in Oregon since the 1998 Thurston High School shooting, which left two students and the shooter's parents dead and another 25 wounded.

Oregon Governor John Kitzhaber attended a community vigil in Troutdale that evening; he called the shooting "a senseless act of violence". President Barack Obama, speaking at a Tumblr-sponsored question-and-answer session the day of the shooting, declared, "We're the only developed country on earth where this happens." Obama further stated that only a massive shift in public opinion could sway Congress to act in favor of greater gun control measures.

In 2015, a bond resolution was proposed, which would grant the district $125,000,000 to help replace, and renovate several schools in the district, and install security upgrades in every school in the district. A portion of this sum of money was used to remodel the northern portion of the main establishment. This specifically includes remodeled science, functional life-skills, culinary, and early childhood education classrooms, cafeteria area, and kitchen. Relocation of the main office and counseling office by the new and more secure main entry. And all buildings that make up the campus internally connected. Construction was started spring of 2017, and is projected to be complete fall of 2018.

Academics
In 2008, 64% of the school's seniors received a high school diploma. Of 611 students, 388 graduated, 130 dropped out, 39 received a modified diploma, and 54 were still in high school the following year.

In 2009, there were nearly 900 freshmen in the incoming class, a record for the school. This was combined with a 25% layoff of teachers, over 40 teachers at the school. This caused class sizes to increase.

Notable alumni
 Diego Hernandez, state representative
 Drew Eubanks, Portland Trail Blazers forward
 David James Duncan, author of The River Why, My Story As Told By Water, The Brothers K

References 

1919 establishments in Oregon
Educational institutions established in 1919
High schools in Multnomah County, Oregon
Public high schools in Oregon
Troutdale, Oregon